Jessica Nicole "Jessa" Anderson (born September 4, 1985 née, Fausch) is an American Christian singer-songwriter. In 2011, Anderson released the album entitled Not Myself Anymore, her first full length studio album that was with the record label BEC Recordings. In 2014, Anderson released her independent label release Whole.

Background and personal life
Born Jessica Nicole "Jessa" Fausch on September 4, 1985, her parents are Timothy Alan and Deborah Lynn "Debra" Fausch (née, McMahan). Anderson grew up in Troy, Michigan and Rochester, Michigan. In addition, Fausch has a younger brother Cory Alexander Fausch. Fausch met Jordan Michael Anderson while touring with her college band from Cedarville University, and soon thereafter transferred to Belmont University in Nashville, Tennessee to be closer to him, and pursue her musical career. In addition, Jordan is a musician himself, and he grew up in Des Moines, Iowa.

On August 14, 2005, Fausch married Jordan Michael Anderson, and became Jessa Anderson. Presently, they have a daughter Lorelei Jade, who was born on August 3, 2010. Also, they have a son Jagger Payne, who was born on March 10, 2013. They reside together in Nashville, Tennessee. Since 2011, the Anderson's have attended The Axis Church in Nashville, Tennessee, which is where her husband Jordan is the worship leader.

Discography

Albums

Singles

References

External links 
 
 WEQP-FM Interview
 BEC Recordings main profile 
 New Release Tuesday article
 The Sound Opinion article

1985 births
Living people
American performers of Christian music
BEC Recordings artists
Singers from Michigan
Singers from Ohio
Singers from Nashville, Tennessee
People from Troy, Michigan
People from Rochester Hills, Michigan
Songwriters from Michigan
Songwriters from Ohio
Songwriters from Tennessee
21st-century American women singers
21st-century American singers